Rajko Prodanović (born 24 April 1986) is a Serbian handball player for Hercegovac Gajdobra.

Club career
After starting out at Jugović, Prodanović moved to Spain and joined Antequera in 2008. He also played abroad for Vardar, Pick Szeged (two spells), Rhein-Neckar Löwen, and Meshkov Brest. In 2018, Prodanović returned to his homeland and signed with Vojvodina.

International career

Youth
At youth level, Prodanović was a regular member of the Serbia and Montenegro winning squad at the 2004 European Under-18 Championship. He subsequently helped the nation win the gold medal at the World Under-19 Championship in August 2005. Later that month, Prodanović also participated at the 2005 World Under-21 Championship, as the team finished as runners-up.

Senior
A full Serbia international since its inception, Prodanović was a member of the team that won the silver medal at the 2012 European Championship. He also participated in the 2012 Summer Olympics and three World Championships (2009, 2011 and 2013).

Honours
Meshkov Brest
 Belarusian Men's Handball Championship: 2016–17, 2017–18
 Belarusian Men's Handball Cup: 2016–17, 2017–18
Vojvodina
 Serbian Handball Super League: 2018–19
 Serbian Handball Cup: 2018–19
 Serbian Handball Super Cup: 2018, 2019

References

External links

 MKSZ record
 Olympic record
 
 

1986 births
Living people
Serbian male handball players
Competitors at the 2009 Mediterranean Games
Mediterranean Games medalists in handball
Mediterranean Games gold medalists for Serbia
Olympic handball players of Serbia
Handball players at the 2012 Summer Olympics
RK Jugović players
RK Vardar players
SC Pick Szeged players
Rhein-Neckar Löwen players
RK Vojvodina players
Liga ASOBAL players
Handball-Bundesliga players
Expatriate handball players
Serbian expatriate sportspeople in Spain
Serbian expatriate sportspeople in North Macedonia
Serbian expatriate sportspeople in Hungary
Serbian expatriate sportspeople in Germany
Serbian expatriate sportspeople in Belarus